Rafael da Cunha Jansen (born December 3, 1988 in São Luís Gonzaga do Maranhão) is a Brazilian footballer. He most recently played for Ratchaburi Mitr Phol.

Honours

Remo
Campeonato Paraense: 2019

References

External links
 Rafael Jansen at playmakerstats.com (English version of ogol.com.br)

1988 births
Living people
Brazilian footballers
Treze Futebol Clube players
Campinense Clube players
Boa Esporte Clube players
Clube do Remo players
Horizonte Futebol Clube players
Rafael Jansen
Association football defenders